The naval district was a U.S. Navy military and administrative command ashore. Apart from Naval District Washington, the Districts were disestablished and renamed Navy Regions about 1999, and are now under Commander, Naval Installations Command (CNIC).

They were established for the purpose of decentralizing the Navy Department's functions with respect to the control of the coastwise sea communications and the shore activities outside the department proper, and for the further purpose of centralizing under one command:

 (a) For military coordination, all naval activities, and
 (b) For administrative coordination, all naval activities with specific exceptions, within the district and the waters thereof.

The limits of the naval districts are laid down in article 1480, Navy Regulations. Those limits extend to seaward so far as to include the coastwise sea lanes (art. 1486 (1), Navy Regulations).

"Each naval district shall be commanded by a designated commandant, who is the direct representative of the Navy Department, including its bureaus and offices, in all matters affecting district activity" (Art. 1481, Navy Regulations.).

1st Naval District 
The boundaries of the First Naval District, to be headquartered at Portsmouth Navy Yard in Kittery, Maine (and later in Boston), were established on 7 May 1903 in accordance with General Order No. 128, signed by Acting Secretary of the Navy Charles H. Darling. Until late 1915 no personnel were assigned to the district staff. In 1945 the district was headquartered at Boston, Massachusetts, and consisted of the following geographic areas: Maine, New Hampshire, Vermont, Massachusetts, and Rhode Island (including Block Island and NAS Quonset Point). The First Naval District was disestablished on 7 October 1976 and control passed to the Fourth Naval District.

2nd Naval District 
Created with the other original districts in 1903, the Second Naval District was the smallest of the lot. It was headquartered in Newport, Rhode Island, and covered only Rhode Island and adjacent waters. It was disestablished and its areas incorporated into the First and Third Districts on March 15, 1919, after the end of World War I.

3rd Naval District 
The Third Naval District, headquartered at New York, New York, was established on 7 May 1903 in accordance with General Order No. 128, signed by Acting Secretary of the Navy Charles H. Darling. Puerto Rico was initially part of the district due to good communications between New York and Puerto Rico. In 1919 Puerto Rico was removed from the district and placed directly under the control of the Chief of Naval Operations. In 1945 the district, still headquartered at New York, consisted of the following geographic areas: Connecticut, New York, the northern part of New Jersey (including counties of Mercer, Monmouth, and all counties north thereof), and also the Nantucket Shoals Lightship. The Third Naval District was disestablished on 7 October 1976 and functions were transferred to the Fourth Naval District.

4th Naval District 
The boundaries of the Fourth Naval District, to be headquartered at League Island Navy Yard in Philadelphia, Pennsylvania, were established on 7 May 1903 in accordance with General Order No. 128, signed by Acting Secretary of the Navy Charles H. Darling. No personnel were assigned to the district staff until late 1915. In 1945 the district, still headquartered in Philadelphia, consisted of the following geographic areas: Pennsylvania, the southern part of New Jersey (including the counties of Burlington, Ocean, and all counties south thereof), and Delaware (including Winter Quarters Shoal Light Vessel). On 7 October 1976 this command absorbed the functions of the First and Third Naval Districts. The Fourth Naval District was disestablished on 30 September 1980.

5th Naval District 
The boundaries of the Fifth Naval District, to be headquartered at the Norfolk Navy Yard in Norfolk, Virginia, were established on 7 May 1903 in accordance with General Order No. 128, signed by Acting Secretary of the Navy Charles H. Darling. Until late 1915 no personnel were assigned to the district staff. In 1945 the district was headquartered at the Naval Operating Base at Norfolk, Virginia, and consisted of the following geographic areas: Maryland less Anne Arundel, Prince Georges, Montgomery, St. Mary's, Calvert, and Charles Counties; West Virginia; Virginia less Arlington, Fairfax, Stafford, King George, Prince William, and Westmoreland Counties; and the Counties of Currituck, Camden, Pasquotank, Gates, Perquimans, Chowan, Tyrrell, Washington, Hyde, Beaufort, Pamlico, Craven, Jones, Carteret, Onslow, and Dare in North Carolina; also the Diamond Shoals Lightship. The Fifth Naval District was disestablished on 30 September 1980.

6th Naval District 
The boundaries of the Sixth Naval District, to be headquartered at Charleston Navy Yard in Charleston, South Carolina, were established on 7 May 1903 in accordance with General Order No. 128, signed by Acting Secretary of the Navy Charles H. Darling. Until approximately 1916 no personnel were assigned to the district staff. In 1945 the district, still headquartered at Charleston, consisted of the following geographic areas: South Carolina, Georgia, and North Carolina, except Counties of Camden, Pasquotank, Gates, Perquimans, Chowan, Tyrrell, Washington, Hyde, Beaufort, Pamlico, Craven, Jones, Carteret, Onslow, and Dare; and the Counties of Nassau and Duval County, Florida in Florida. The Sixth Naval District was disestablished on 30 September 1980.

7th Naval District 
Jacksonville/Miami, Florida

8th Naval District 
New Orleans, Louisiana

9th Naval District 
The boundaries of the Ninth Naval District, headquartered at the Lake Training Station in Lake Bluff, Illinois, were established on 7 May 1903 in accordance with General Order No. 128, signed by Acting Secretary of the Navy Charles H. Darling. In 1911 the district was activated as part of an administrative unit called the "Ninth, Tenth, and Eleventh Naval Districts". In 1920 the district became a separate entity with its own district staff. In 1945 the district, headquartered at what was now known as Great Lakes Naval Training Station in Illinois, consisted of the following geographic areas: Ohio, Michigan, Kentucky, Indiana, Illinois, Wisconsin, Minnesota, Iowa, Missouri, North Dakota, South Dakota, Nebraska, and Kansas. The Ninth Naval District was disestablished on 30 June 1979 and its functions transferred to the Fourth, Eighth, Eleventh and Thirteenth Naval Districts.

10th Naval District 
The boundaries of the Tenth Naval District, to be headquartered at Lake Training Station in Lake Bluff, Illinois, were established on 7 May 1903 in accordance with General Order No. 128, signed by Acting Secretary of the Navy Charles H. Darling. The district was activated in 1911 as part of a larger administrative unit called "Ninth, Tenth and Eleventh Naval Districts". At some point it was disestablished. It was reactivated on January 1, 1940 at San Juan, Puerto Rico under the command of Rear Admiral Raymond A. Spruance, USN. It consisted of the following geographic areas: Puerto Rico, Vieques, Culebra, Virgin islands, and the Naval Reservation, Guantanamo, and US Naval shore activities at Jamaica, Trinidad, Bahamas, Antigua, St. Lucia, and British Guiana. The Tenth Naval District was disestablished on 30 September 1980(?).

11th Naval District 
The Eleventh Naval District, headquartered at the Lake Training Station in Lake Bluff, Illinois, was established on 7 May 1903 in accordance with General Order No. 128, signed by Acting Secretary of the Navy Charles H. Darling. The district was activated in 1911 as part of a larger administrative unit known as the "Ninth, Tenth and Eleventh Naval Districts". In 1920 the Eleventh Naval District became a separate Naval District. In 1945 the district was headquartered at San Diego, California, and consisted of the following geographic areas: New Mexico; Arizona; Clark County, Nevada; the southern part of California, including Counties of Santa Barbara, Kern, and San Bernardino, and all counties south thereof. The Eleventh Naval District was disestablished on 30 September 1980.

12th Naval District 
The boundaries of the Twelfth Naval District, to be headquartered at the Mare Island in Vallejo, California, were established on 7 May 1903 in accordance with General Order No. 128, signed by Acting Secretary of the Navy Charles H. Darling. In 1945 the district was headquartered at San Francisco, California, and consisted of the following geographic areas Colorado; Utah; Nevada except Clark County; the northern part of California, including counties of San Luis Obispo, Kings, Tulare, Inyo, and all counties north thereof. The Twelfth Naval District was disestablished in 1977 and functions were transferred to the Eleventh Naval District.

13th Naval District 
The boundaries of the Thirteenth Naval District, to be headquartered at the Puget Sound Navy Yard in Bremerton, Washington, were established on 7 May 1903 in accordance with General Order No. 128, signed by Acting Secretary of the Navy Charles H. Darling. The headquarters of the district was transferred to Seattle, Washington, in 1926. In 1945 the district consisted of the following geographic areas: Washington, Oregon, Idaho, Montana, and Wyoming. The Thirteenth Naval District was disestablished on 30 September 1980.

14th Naval District 
The Fourteenth Naval District, headquartered at the Pearl Harbor, Hawaii, was established in 1916. In 1945 the district consisted of the following geographic areas: the Hawaiian Islands, and islands to westward, including Midway, Wake, Kure, and Johnston, and Kingman Reef. The Fourteenth Naval District was disestablished on 30 June 1979 and control was passed on to the Commander in Chief, U.S. Pacific Fleet.

15th Naval District 
The Fifteenth Naval District, headquartered at Balboa in the Canal Zone, was established on 28 November 1917 by an executive order dated 27 August 1917 and encompassed "the waters adjacent to the Canal Zone exclusive of the area between the inner limits of the defensive sea areas established at the Atlantic Entrance and the Pacific Entrance of the Panama Canal". In 1945 the district consisted of the following geographic area: the Panama Canal Zone. The Fifteenth Naval District was disestablished on 31 December 1975 and its responsibilities were transferred to the Panama Canal U.S. Naval Station.

16th Naval District 
The Sixteenth Naval District, before World War II consisted of the Philippine Islands. See also United States Asiatic Fleet.

17th Naval District 
The Seventeenth Naval District, headquartered at Kodiak (Temp. Adak), Alaska, was established on 15 April 1944. In 1945 the district consisted of the following geographic area: Alaska, including the Aleutian Islands. The Seventeenth Naval District was disestablished on 30 June 1971 and control was transferred to the 18th Naval District.

18th Naval District

19th Naval District

20th Naval District

Naval District Washington
Washington, D.C.

Naval district configuration in 1996
Over the years, the number of districts, through mergers, was whittled down to 10 by 1987. On 30 May 1996 the 8th and 2nd Districts were combined to form the new 8th District. As such, the district organization in 1996 included nine districts. Their designations and headquarters are:

 1st (Boston, Massachusetts)
 5th (Portsmouth, Virginia)
 7th (Miami, Florida)
 8th (New Orleans, Louisiana and St. Louis, Missouri)
 9th (Cleveland, Ohio)
 11th (Alameda, California)
 13th (Seattle, Washington)
 14th (Honolulu, Hawaii)
 17th (Juneau, Alaska)

Notes

External links
 Navy Regions in the Continental U.S. (2007)
 Navy Regions outside the Continental U.S. (2007)
 Naval District Manual (1927)
 Map of Naval Districts (1944)
 Naval District Washington
 The history of the First Naval District
 Fifth Naval District 
 The Third Naval District, headquartered at New York, New York
 Fourth Naval District
 Sixth Naval District
 Lists of Senior Officers and Civilian Officials of the US Navy
 US Coast Guard History FAQS